Ceratophaga is a genus of moths belonging to the family Tineidae. The name "ceratophaga" is derived from the Greek for "horn eater". Sixteen species are currently recognised, widespread in the Afrotropical realm and Asia. In the Americas one species has been described: Ceratophaga vicinella, which occurs in the southeastern United States. Twelve of the known species occur in Africa, and of those Ceratophaga vastella is perhaps the best-known. 

The larvae of most Tineidae (of which clothes moths are the most familiar) have adapted to feeding on non-herbaceous material, but Ceratophaga are remarkable in that they feed, apparently exclusively, on solid keratin from dead vertebrates. For most species this usually means the horns and hooves of ungulates, but the North American Ceratophaga vicinella feeds on the shells of the tortoise Gopherus polyphemus.

References
 A Caterpillar that Eats Tortoise Shells

Tineidae
Tineidae genera